Pee Vee may refer to:

Pee Vee, Harlan County, Kentucky
Abdul Wahab Peevee, an entrepreneur and a politician from Indian Union Muslim League
 Perumal Venkatesan, a.k.a. PeeVee, a photographer basedin Bangalore, India

See also
PV (disambiguation)
Pee Wee (disambiguation)
 Peavey (disambiguation)